Crime Mob is an American hip hop group from Atlanta consisting of six members: M.I.G., Cyco Black, Princess, Lil' Jay, Diamond, and Killa C. The group is best known for their songs "Knuck If You Buck" and "Rock Yo Hips". After an arrest in 2003, member Killa C left the group. Crime Mob reunited and performed at Atlanta's Hot 107.9's Birthday Bash in 2012; Princess was the only absent member. In 2018, all members of Crime Mob were reunited by Atlanta based producer Mike Will Made It on a song called "We Can Hit" featuring Slim Jxmmi of Rae Sremmurd. The song is featured on the Creed II movie soundtrack. Crime Mob was discovered by Grand Master Tommy Phillips IV of Crunk Incorporated known as #LiTgod Serious Lord.

Discography

Albums
Crime Mob
Released: August 10, 2004
U.S. Billboard 200: #90
Top R&B/Hip-Hop Albums: #11
U.S. Sales: 270,000+
RIAA Certification: N/A
Hated on Mostly
Released: March 20, 2007
U.S. Billboard 200: #31
Top Rap Albums: #4
Top R&B/Hip-Hop Albums: #10
U.S. Sales: 67,000+
RIAA Certification: N/A

Singles

References

External links
 Official justRHYMES.com profile

African-American musical groups
American crunk groups
Musical groups established in 2004
Musical groups from Georgia (U.S. state)
Southern hip hop groups
Gangsta rap groups
Warner Records artists
Reprise Records artists